Greenwich Township  is a township in Warren County, in the U.S. state of New Jersey. As of the 2020 United States census, the township's population was 5,473, a drop of 239 (-4.2%) from the 2010 census count of 5,712, which in turn reflected an increase of 1,347 (+30.9%) from the 4,365 counted in the 2000 census. 

Greenwich Township has at various times been a part of most of Northwestern New Jersey's counties. The township was first mentioned in official documents on October 9, 1738, as a part of Hunterdon County. On March 15, 1739, it became part of the newly formed Morris County. On January 22, 1750, portions of the township were taken to form Hardwick Township. On June 8, 1753, Sussex County was created, and Greenwich Township was shifted again. Portions of the township were taken on May 30, 1754, to form both Mansfield Township and Oxford Township. The township was incorporated by an act of the New Jersey Legislature on February 21, 1798. It found its current home when Warren County was formed on November 20, 1824. On April 8, 1839, portions of the township were taken to create Franklin Township and Harmony Township. On March 7, 1851, Phillipsburg was created from parts of Greenwich, and Pohatcong Township went off on its own as of January 1, 1882. The township was named for Greenwich, England.

Geography
According to the U.S. Census Bureau, the township had a total area of 10.60 square miles (27.45 km2), including 10.58 square miles (27.40 km2) of land and 0.02 square miles (0.04 km2) of water (0.15%).

Greenwich CDP (with a 2010 Census population of 2,755), Stewartsville (with 349 residents in 2010) and Upper Stewartsville (2010 population of 212) are unincorporated communities and census-designated places (CDPs) located within the township.

Other unincorporated communities, localities and place names located partially or completely within the township include Coopersville, Kennedy Mills, Port Warren and Still Valley.

Greenwich Township borders the municipalities of Franklin Township, Lopatcong Township and Pohatcong Township in Warren County; and Bloomsbury in Hunterdon County.

Demographics

2010 census

The Census Bureau's 2006–2010 American Community Survey showed that (in 2010 inflation-adjusted dollars) median household income was $102,250 (with a margin of error of +/− $16,103) and the median family income was $112,535 (+/− $19,851). Males had a median income of $95,469 (+/− $9,585) versus $60,986 (+/− $7,346) for females. The per capita income for the borough was $37,290 (+/− $3,322). About 1.1% of families and 1.7% of the population were below the poverty line, including 2.2% of those under age 18 and 5.2% of those age 65 or over.

2000 census
As of the 2020 U.S. census, there were 4,365 people, 1,421 households, and 1,223 families residing in the township. The population density was 413.6 people per square mile (159.7/km2). There were 1,477 housing units at an average density of 139.9 per square mile (54.1/km2). The racial makeup of the township was 93.26% White, 2.47% African American, 0.27% Native American, 2.22% Asian, 0.07% Pacific Islander, 0.57% from other races, and 1.12% from two or more races. Hispanic or Latino of any race were 3.80% of the population.

There were 1,421 households, out of which 51.6% had children under the age of 18 living with them, 79.2% were married couples living together, 4.9% had a female householder with no husband present, and 13.9% were non-families. 11.4% of all households were made up of individuals, and 4.4% had someone living alone who was 65 years of age or older. The average household size was 3.07 and the average family size was 3.34.

In the township, the population was spread out, with 33.6% under the age of 18, 3.4% from 18 to 24, 38.0% from 25 to 44, 18.7% from 45 to 64, and 6.2% who were 65 years of age or older. The median age was 34 years. For every 100 females, there were 97.4 males. For every 100 females age 18 and over, there were 96.0 males.

The median income for a household in the township was $87,613, and the median income for a family was $92,579. Males had a median income of $69,926 versus $34,934 for females. The per capita income for the township was $32,886. About 1.1% of families and 2.4% of the population were below the poverty line, including 2.5% of those under age 18 and none of those age 65 or over.

Government

Local government 
Greenwich Township is governed under the Township form of New Jersey municipal government, one of 141 municipalities (of the 564) statewide that use this form, the second-most commonly used form of government in the state. The Township Committee is comprised of five members, who are elected directly by the voters at-large in partisan elections to serve three-year terms of office on a staggered basis, with either one or two seats coming up for election each year as part of the November general election in a three-year cycle. At an annual reorganization meeting, the Township Committee selects one of its members to serve as Mayor and another as Deputy Mayor.

, members of the Greenwich Township Committee are Mayor Robert M. Barsony (R, term on committee and as mayor ends December 31, 2022), Deputy Mayor Paul Beam (R, term on committee and as deputy mayor ends 2022), Brian Baylor (R, 2023), Bill Kanyuck (R, 2023; appointed to serve an unexpired term) and Lillian McDermott (R, 2024).

In January 2022, the Township Committee appointed Bill Kanyuck to fill the seat expiring in December 2023 that had been held by Frank Marchetta until he resigned from office. Kanyuck will serve on an interim basis until the November 2022 general election, when voters will select a candidate to serve the balance of the term of office.

The Township Committee had three vacancies in September 2015, after Tom Callari announced that he was moving out of the township, Joe Tauriello left office after a DUI arrest was made public and Angelo Faillace resigned in protest of the process of selecting a council replacement. With a majority of seats vacant, Governor Chris Christie appointed Bob Barsony, Bill Kanyuck and Will Spencer to fill the three vacant seats. In November 2015, Deputy Mayor Elaine Emiliani resigned from office and was replaced by Frank Marchetta.

Federal, state and county representation 
Greenwich Township is located in the 7th Congressional District and is part of New Jersey's 23rd state legislative district.

Politics
As of March 23, 2011, there were a total of 3,505 registered voters in Greenwich Township, of which 644 (18.4% vs. 21.5% countywide) were registered as Democrats, 1,474 (42.1% vs. 35.3%) were registered as Republicans and 1,385 (39.5% vs. 43.1%) were registered as Unaffiliated. There were two voters registered as either Libertarians or Greens. Among the township's 2010 Census population, 61.4% (vs. 62.3% in Warren County) were registered to vote, including 91.6% of those ages 18 and over (vs. 81.5% countywide).

In the 2012 presidential election, Republican Mitt Romney received 1,415 votes (57.5% vs. 56.0% countywide), ahead of Democrat Barack Obama with 1,002 votes (40.7% vs. 40.8%) and other candidates with 28 votes (1.1% vs. 1.7%), among the 2,462 ballots cast by the township's 3,545 registered voters, for a turnout of 69.4% (vs. 66.7% in Warren County). In the 2008 presidential election, Republican John McCain received 1,448 votes (54.3% vs. 55.2% countywide), ahead of Democrat Barack Obama with 1,156 votes (43.3% vs. 41.4%) and other candidates with 19 votes (0.7% vs. 1.6%), among the 2,667 ballots cast by the township's 3,543 registered voters, for a turnout of 75.3% (vs. 73.4% in Warren County). In the 2004 presidential election, Republican George W. Bush received 1,645 votes (62.0% vs. 61.0% countywide), ahead of Democrat John Kerry with 967 votes (36.4% vs. 37.2%) and other candidates with 35 votes (1.3% vs. 1.3%), among the 2,654 ballots cast by the township's 3,310 registered voters, for a turnout of 80.2% (vs. 76.3% in the whole county).

In the 2013 gubernatorial election, Republican Chris Christie received 73.0% of the vote (954 cast), ahead of Democrat Barbara Buono with 24.8% (324 votes), and other candidates with 2.1% (28 votes), among the 1,323 ballots cast by the township's 3,622 registered voters (17 ballots were spoiled), for a turnout of 36.5%. In the 2009 gubernatorial election, Republican Chris Christie received 1,141 votes (66.3% vs. 61.3% countywide), ahead of Democrat Jon Corzine with 401 votes (23.3% vs. 25.7%), Independent Chris Daggett with 140 votes (8.1% vs. 9.8%) and other candidates with 22 votes (1.3% vs. 1.5%), among the 1,720 ballots cast by the township's 3,442 registered voters, yielding a 50.0% turnout (vs. 49.6% in the county).

Education
Students in public school for pre-kindergarten through eighth grade attend the Greenwich Township School District. As of the 2018–19 school year, the district, comprised of two schools, had an enrollment of 686 students and 67.3 classroom teachers (on an FTE basis), for a student–teacher ratio of 10.2:1. Schools in the district (with 2018–19 enrollment data from the National Center for Education Statistics) are 
Greenwich Elementary School with 426 students in grades pre-kindergarten to 5 and 
Stewartsville Middle School with 258 students in grades 6–8.

Public school students in ninth through twelfth grades attend Phillipsburg High School in Phillipsburg, which serves students from the Town of Phillipsburg as part of a sending/receiving relationship with the Phillipsburg School District. The high school also serves students from four other sending communities: Alpha, Bloomsbury (in Hunterdon County), Lopatcong Township and Pohatcong Township. As of the 2018–19 school year, the high school had an enrollment of 2,324 students and 197.5 classroom teachers (on an FTE basis), for a student–teacher ratio of 11.8:1.

Students from the township and from all of Warren County are eligible to attend Ridge and Valley Charter School in Frelinghuysen Township (for grades K–8) or Warren County Technical School in Washington borough (for 9–12), with special education services provided by local districts supplemented throughout the county by the Warren County Special Services School District in Oxford Township (for PreK–12).

Transportation

Greenwich is accessible from Interstate, U.S. State and County roads. Interstate 78 passes through in the central area while U.S. Route 22 runs along the western border before running concurrent with I-78. Route 57 passes through in the north and Route 173's western end starts at the western municipal border at I-78/US 22.
County Road 519 travels through the western corner for a short distance while County Road 579 passes through very briefly in the south before terminating at Route 173.

A small part of the Norfolk Southern Railway's Lehigh Line (formerly the mainline of the Lehigh Valley Railroad), runs through the southern part of Greenwich Township on its way to Phillipsburg, New Jersey.

Notable people

People who were born in, residents of, or otherwise closely associated with Greenwich Township include:

 Orange Cassidy (born 1984), professional wrestler
 Henry Green (1828–1900), Chief Justice of the Supreme Court of Pennsylvania
 William Maxwell (1733–1796), brigadier general in the Continental Army during the American Revolutionary War

References

External links

Greenwich Township website
History of Greenwich, New Jersey

 
1798 establishments in New Jersey
Populated places established in 1798
Township form of New Jersey government
Townships in Warren County, New Jersey